George Milton Murray (born June 17, 1953) is an academic in Chemistry and Material Science.  He specializes in chemical analysis, sensors and molecularly imprinted polymers.

Murray was born in Manchester, Tennessee.  He spent a year at the University of the South (Sewanee) before enlisting in the United States Navy.  He served in the United States Navy from 1972 until 1979 achieving the rank of Machinists Mate Second Class.  He received his B.A. in chemistry from the University of Tennessee, Knoxville in 1982 and the Ph.D. in chemistry from The University of Tennessee, Knoxville in 1988.  He performed Post-doctoral work in the Transuranium Research Laboratory at the Oak Ridge National Laboratory.  He was Associate Chemist at the Ames Laboratory at Iowa State University from 1990 to 1992.  He accepted a position as Assistant Professor of Chemistry at the University of Maryland, Baltimore County in 1992 and advanced to Associate Professor with tenure in 1998.  He then accepted a position as Senior Professional Staff at the Johns Hopkins University Applied Physics Laboratory (APL).  He achieved the rank of Principal Professional Staff in 2004 and was appointed Applied Chemistry Section Supervisor in 2005.  He left Johns Hopkins to become Research Associate Professor of Materials Science and Engineering at University of Tennessee Space Institute, Tullahoma, Tennessee in May 2008.

Murray has published over 50 peer-reviewed papers in scientific journals as well as articles in the popular science press.  He holds nineteen U.S. patents, thirteen world patents and was named as one of twenty-five Master Inventors at APL.

Patents
 US Patent Office

References
 The Johns Hopkins University Applied Physics Laboratory

Influences
George K. Schweitzer

Sources
https://web.archive.org/web/20100609200916/http://www.utsi.edu/faculty/gmurray/gmurray.htm
https://web.archive.org/web/20100710160437/http://cla.utsi.edu/PersonnelDirectory/Faculty/Murray/Murray.htm
http://gmurray.utsi.edu/

1953 births
21st-century American chemists
Living people
University of Tennessee faculty